Joachim Günther (born 22 October 1948) was a German politician of the Free Democratic Party (FDP) and former member of the German Bundestag.

Life 
Günther was a member of the German Bundestag from 1990 to 2013. Here he was for a short time from 15 to 28 January 1991 parliamentary managing director of the FDP parliamentary group. Joachim Günther always entered the Bundestag via the Saxony state list. His constituency is Vogtland - Plauen.

Literature

References

1948 births
Members of the Bundestag for Saxony
Members of the Bundestag 2009–2013
Members of the Bundestag 2005–2009
Members of the Bundestag 2002–2005
Members of the Bundestag 1998–2002
Members of the Bundestag 1994–1998
Members of the Bundestag 1990–1994
Members of the Bundestag for the Free Democratic Party (Germany)
Date of death missing